Chris Brandt (born February 4, 1970) is an American filmmaker and cartoonist, director of the documentary "Independents".

Biography
Brandt was born in Silver Spring, Maryland, the son of a U.S. diplomat, and spent his youth in several countries. He studied at the University of Maryland and UC Santa Cruz. In 1993, after graduating college, he pursued cartooning on his own, eventually becoming associated with the comic book co-op Puppy Toss in Berkeley, California, and creating the Artfly mini-comics series with fellow cartoonist Jesse Reklaw. 

He turned his attentions to film making and video in 2000, creating the celebrated Dance, Voldo, Dance in 2003, the award-winning short film Closing Time in 2005, and the critically acclaimed feature documentary Independents in 2007.

He chauffeured for Karen Black at the 2008 Sundance Film Festival.

His feature documentary about Jim Woodring, The Illumination of Jim Woodring, premiered on Comic Book Resources online in 2020.

Awards
Brandt's short film, Closing Time, won "Best Narrative Short" at the 2005 Northampton Independent Film Festival, and "Best Short Film" at the 2006 Longbaugh Film Festival. The short film placed 2nd for "Best Short" in the 2006 East Lansing Film Festival.

Brandt's Dance, Voldo, Dance was nominated for "Best Virtual Performance" at the 2005 Machinima Film Festival.

Accepted the 2003 Eisner Award for Jason Shiga.

Works
Films
 The Illumination of Jim Woodring (2020)
 Ambien & Aaron (2013)
 Independents: A Guide for the Creative Spirit (2007)
 Closing Time (2005)

Comic book series
 Bainst #1-6, 1996–2004, self-published minicomics
 Far Flung, 1999, comic book calendar
 Artfly #1-3, self-published minicomics

Television
 Comic Book Geeks (2007–2013)

Machinima
 Dance, Voldo, Dance (2003)

External links
 
 IMDB profile
 Far Flung 2012
 L.A. Storyboard Artist
 The Illumination of Jim Woodring (Documentary Website) (2020)
 Ambien & Aaron (Documentary Website) (2013)
 Independents (Documentary Website) (2007)
 Closing Time (Short Film Website) (2006)
 "CBR premieres The Illumination of Jim Woodring", April 16, 2020
 "Review of The Illumination of Jim Woodring", Vents Magazine, April 16, 2020
 "Review of The Illumination of Jim Woodring", Film Threat, July 11, 2019
 "Enzian Announces 2014 Florida Film Festival Program Lineup"
 "Inkstuds", audio interview by Robin McConnell, broadcast May 14, 2009
 Indie Film Journal, review of Independents by David Walker, May 18, 2008
 DVD Talk, review of Independents by Jamie S. Rich, May 6, 2008
 The Comics Reporter, interview by Tom Spurgeon about Independents, published September 15, 2007
 Fat Free Film episode 41, Joel Marshall interviewed Brandt, broadcast September 4, 2006
 Fat Free Film episode 31, Brandt co-hosts interview with Paul Dinello, broadcast June 24, 2006
 SMH, "Battle of the Dance" by Joanna McErvale, Review of Dance, Voldo, Dance, published August 19, 2004
 Time, "The Art of the Con" by Andrew D. Arnold, published July 25, 2003
 Bookslut, documenting a personal experience of the Shiga impersonation, August 2003

Machinima
American filmmakers
Living people
1970 births
People from Silver Spring, Maryland
American cartoonists
American male writers
American directors
University of Maryland, College Park alumni
University of California, Santa Cruz alumni